K. Praveen Nayak (born 1962) is an Indian film director, in the Kannada film industry.

Personal life
K. Praveen Nayak was born in 1962 to K. Krishna Nayak and K. Radha Nayak in Mangalore, Karnataka, India.

Career
Praveen started his career in photography, but moved to directing soon thereafter, directing many Kannada movies. More recently he has also directed a short film entitled Twitter Loka.

Books
K. Praveen Nayak, was close aid of the actor Dr. Rajkumar has written book on the legend "Rajkumar: Ondu beLaku" He also published a condensed version of the book as "Rajkumar: Ondu beLaku" Praveen has also penned another book in English on the veteran actor "Rajkumar: A Journey with the legend".

Television
Praveen was an anchor for Doordarshan. He has also directed a popular serial Shri Ramakrishna Parahamsa telecasted in Doordarshan. In this serial, Praveen also acted as Ramakrishna.

Filmography

Acting

Direction

Awards
Karnataka State Award: Best Book for ರಾಜ್ ಕುಮಾರ್: ಒಂದು ಬೆಳಕು (Rajkumar: Ondu beLaku), 2012

References

External links
 
 

Kannada film directors
1962 births
Living people
Artists from Mangalore
Indian documentary filmmakers
20th-century Indian film directors
Male actors in Kannada cinema
Indian male film actors
Film directors from Karnataka
21st-century Indian male actors
21st-century Indian film directors